Dean Smith (born 22 March 1988 in Wolverhampton, West Midlands) is a British racing driver, who was the 2009 champion of the British Formula Renault Championship and winner of that year's McLaren Autosport BRDC Award.

Career

Formula BMW
After previously competing in karting, Smith was awarded a Formula BMW scholarship in 2004, finishing 15th in the Formula BMW UK championship. He took three wins on his way to winning the championship in 2005.

Formula Renault

Smith moved up to the British Formula Renault Championship in 2006, finishing 9th in the overall standings. In 2007, he finished as runner-up to Fortec Motorsport teammate Duncan Tappy. He made the move to the Eurocup Formula Renault 2.0 in 2008 for Fortec, but finished down in 17th place. Smith finished 2008 by scoring two fourth-placed finishes on his British Formula 3 debut with Fortec. A lack of funds prevented him from a full F3 campaign in 2009, meaning he moved to the Porsche Carrera Cup. He was then given the opportunity to join British Formula Renault team Manor Competition, and took seven victories on his way to winning the title, despite missing the opening round of the championship at Brands Hatch due to him competing in the supporting Porsche races at the circuit. He also took second place in the final race of the Eurocup season at the brand-new Ciudad del Motor de Aragón circuit in Spain.

In December 2009 he was awarded the prestigious McLaren Autosport BRDC Award. As part of the prize he will test a McLaren Formula One car.

GP3 Series
Smith will race in the new GP3 Series in 2010, with Carlin, after securing support from the Racing Steps Foundation.

Complete GP3 Series results
(key) (Races in bold indicate pole position) (Races in italics indicate fastest lap)

References

External links
 Official website
 Career statistics from Driver Database

1988 births
Living people
Sportspeople from Wolverhampton
English racing drivers
Formula BMW UK drivers
British Formula Renault 2.0 drivers
Formula Renault Eurocup drivers
British Formula Three Championship drivers
GP3 Series drivers
Porsche Carrera Cup GB drivers
Carlin racing drivers
Manor Motorsport drivers
Fluid Motorsport Development drivers
BVM Racing drivers
Fortec Motorsport drivers